Stefano Gherardini (1695-1755) was an Italian painter, prolific in painting genre scenes or bambocciate.

Biography
He was a pupil of Giuseppe Gambarini.
 He was born and died in Bologna. He is described by Pietro Zani as a painter of capricci, caricatures, di pittocchi, of charlatans and all things recognized under the title of bambocciate

References

1696 births
1755 deaths
18th-century Italian painters
Italian male painters
Painters from Bologna
Italian genre painters
18th-century Italian male artists